The Roger Maris Museum is a 70-foot (21m) display case museum in West Acres Shopping Center in Fargo, North Dakota. It is dedicated as a permanent shrine to Major League Baseball player and local alumni Roger Maris, centering on his life and baseball career, most notably for the New York Yankees during the 1961 season in which Maris hit a then-record 61 home runs. The museum is open during mall hours and is free to the public.

History
The Roger Maris Museum was created by Fargo American Legion members Robert Smith and James McLaughlin. Originally, Maris declined to have a museum erected in his honor. He initially agreed only if it be on public display and charge no admission, as he did not want to capitalize on his success. Maris also personally chose to have the museum site be located within West Acres. In 2003, the museum was remodeled during the mall's renovation.

On July 26, 2016, at approximately 2:15 a.m. CDT, the museum was burglarized. The items stolen included the 1960 AL MVP plaque as well as the S. Rae Hickok Belt which had been awarded to Maris in 1961. The culprits were never arrested nor the items ever recovered. The incident remains an open investigation by the FBI.

Exhibits
The museum is located in the southeast wing of West Acres. It features a small theatre with documentary films about Maris and is furnished with actual seats from Yankee Stadium. Among the exhibits are Maris' uniforms, a replica of his 1961 locker, his two MVP awards, Sultan of Swat Crowns, many bats and home run balls, baseball cards and memorabilia as well as relics from his amateur years.

References

External links
The Roger Maris Museum website

Sports museums in North Dakota
Maris, Roger
Museums in Fargo, North Dakota
Baseball museums and halls of fame
Museums established in 1984
1984 establishments in North Dakota